Women Boxing Archive Network (also known as WBAN) is an American-based women’s boxing website. The website reports women's boxing news, archives women's boxing history, publishes women's boxing results, creates their own women's boxing world ranking and profiles women boxers. The website was founded and is owned by former professional boxer (ranked number 1 in the world in 1979) Sue Fox; it began in May 1998.

History 
In 2013, WBAN started planning for the inaugural International Women's Boxing Hall of Fame. Their primary mission is to "call honorary attention to those professional female boxers (now retired) along with men and women whose contributions to the sport and its athletes, from outside the ring, have been instrumental in growing female boxing." The first induction took place in 2014 and since then it has occurred annually.

WBAN World Champions 
Similar to the magazine The Ring, WBAN has created their own lineal world champions. It was designed to recognize the "best of the best" of boxing championship title holders. WBAN does not act as a sanctioning body, or has sanctioning fees. The only thing that is paid by the promoter is the belt to be made. WBAN uses BoxRec as their preferred rankings website, as the belt is only contested between boxers that are ranked 1st and 2nd. The title was first contested on June 13, 2008, on a televised PPV Event called "Finally", in Isleta Casino, Albuquerque, New Mexico between Holly Holm and Mary Jo Sanders. Holms took the title home with a 10-round Unanimous Decision win.

Current WBAN world champions

List of WBAN world champions

Super bantamweight

Featherweight

Super Featherweight

Lightweight

Super Lightweight

Welterweight

Super Welterweight

Super Middleweight

References

External links

Boxing websites
Women's boxing
Archives in the United States
American women's websites